Sword of Honour is an Australian miniseries made in 1986 and aired on Channel Seven. Four 100-minute episodes were made. The series starred Andrew Clarke, Tracy Mann and Alan Fletcher.

The series was about two young men who are trying to get over the horrors of the Vietnam War. Andrew Clarke won best actor in a miniseries, and Tracy Mann won best actress in a miniseries in the Logies.

It had a budget of A$5 million. Principal photography was completed on 18 October 1985 with second unit shot after that in Port Macquarie and Thailand.

Home media
Sword of Honour was released on DVD and Online by Umbrella Entertainment in March 2012. The DVD is compatible with region 4.

References

External links 
 

1980s Australian television miniseries
1986 Australian television series debuts
1986 Australian television series endings